Car Giant Ltd (styled Cargiant) is a British used car dealership based in White City, London. The company was founded in 1979 by Geoffrey Warren who still owns the company.

History
For 2018, Cargiant had pre-tax profits on turnover of £475.8 million. In October 2019, Cargiant planned to create an electric vehicles centre.

In December 2019, the Old Oak and Park Royal Development Corporation (OPDC) had planned to buy 54 acres at Old Oak Common owned by Cargiant by compulsory purchase order, but Cargiant successfully disputed the value of the land, and the sale fell through.

References

British_companies_established_in_1979 
White City, London 
Used car market 
Companies based in London